The viol, viola da gamba, or informally gamba, is any one of a family of bowed, fretted, and stringed instruments with hollow wooden bodies and pegboxes where the tension on the strings can be increased or decreased to adjust the pitch of each of the strings. Frets on the viol are usually made of gut, tied on the fingerboard around the instrument's neck, to enable the performer to stop the strings more cleanly. Frets improve consistency of intonation and lend the stopped notes a tone that better matches the open strings. Viols first appeared in Spain in the mid-to-late 15th century, and were most popular in the Renaissance and Baroque (1600–1750) periods. Early ancestors include the Arabic rebab and the medieval European vielle, but later, more direct possible ancestors include the Venetian viole and the 15th- and 16th-century Spanish vihuela, a six-course plucked instrument tuned like a lute (and also like a present-day viol) that looked like but was quite distinct from (at that time) the four-course guitar (an earlier chordophone).

Although bass viols superficially resemble cellos, viols are different in numerous respects from instruments of the violin family: the viol family has flat rather than curved backs, sloped rather than rounded shoulders, c holes rather than f holes, and five to seven rather than four strings; some of the many additional differences are tuning strategy (in fourths with a third in the middle—similar to a lute—rather than in fifths), the presence of frets, and underhand ("German") rather than overhand ("French") bow grip.

All members of the viol family are played upright (unlike the violin or the viola, which is held under the chin). All viol instruments are held between the legs like a modern cello, hence the Italian name viola da gamba (it. "viol for the leg") was sometimes applied to the instruments of this family.  This distinguishes the viol from the modern violin family, the viola da braccio (it. "viol for the arm").  A player of the viol is commonly known as a gambist, violist  , or violist da gamba. "Violist" shares the spelling, but not the pronunciation, of the word commonly used since the mid-20th century to refer to a player of the viola. It can therefore confuse if used in print where context does not indicate that a viol player is meant, though it is entirely unproblematic, and common, in speech.

History

Vihuelists began playing their flat-edged instruments with a bow in the second half of the 15th century. Within two or three decades, this led to the evolution of an entirely new and dedicated bowed string instrument that retained many of the features of the originally plucked vihuela: a flat back, sharp waist-cuts, frets, thin ribs (initially), and an identical tuning—hence its original name, vihuela de arco; arco is Spanish for "bow".
An influence on the playing posture has been credited to the example of Moorish rabab players.

Stefano Pio argues that a re-examination of documents in the light of newly collected data indicates an origin different from the vihuela de arco from Aragon. According to Pio, the viol (viola da gamba) had its origins and evolved independently in Venice. Pio asserts that it is implausible that the vihuela de arco (which possibly arrived in Rome and Naples after 1483–1487, since Johannes Tinctoris does not mention it before this time) underwent such a rapid evolution by Italian instrument makers – not Venetian (circumstances specifically excluded by Lorenzo da Pavia), nor Mantuan or Ferrarese (as evidenced by Isabella and Alfonso I d'Este's orders from luthiers from other cities) – so that a ten-year span brought the birth and diffusion in Italy of a new family of instruments (viola da gamba or viols). These comprised instruments of different sizes, some as large as the famous violoni as 'big as a man' mentioned by Prospero Bernardino in 1493.

Pio argues that this inconsistency is justifiable only assuming the invention, during the last part of the fifteenth century, of a larger instrument derived from the medieval violetta, to which was gradually added other strings to allow a greater extension to the low register that resulted from its increased size. The fifth string, already present in some specimens of these violette as a drone (bordone), was incorporated into the neck when they were expanded in size. This was then surpassed by a sixth string, named basso, which fixed the lower sound produced by the instrument. In Pio's view, the origin of the viola da gamba is tied to the evolution of the smaller medieval violetta or vielle, which was originally fitted with a fifth string drone, where the name remained unchanged even though it ceased to perform this function.

Ian Woodfield, in his The Early History of the Viol, points to evidence that the viol does start with the vihuela but that Italian makers of the instrument immediately began to apply their own highly developed instrument-making traditions to the early version of the instrument when it was introduced into Italy.

Initially, the family of viole ("viols") shared common characteristics but differed in the way they were played. The increase in the dimensions of the "viola" determined the birth of the viol and the definitive change in the manner the instrument was held, as musicians found it easier to play it vertically. The first consort of viols formed by four players was documented at the end of the fifteenth century in the courts of Mantua and Ferrara, but was also present in popular Venetian music ambience, noted at the Scuola Grande di San Marco, 1499; Venetian culture remained independent of Spanish influence and consequently unfamiliar with the instruments of those lands, such as the bowed vihuela de arco. Groups of viol players, generally called violoni, was established in the Venetian Scuole Grandi around 1530–40, but the highly traditional environment of these institutions suggests that these groups would have already been active in the general urban context during the previous two decades (1510–1520). Some of these players were known to have travelled to distant lands, including Vienna, the Duchy of Bavaria or the Kingdom of England where they were welcomed at the court of the Tudors and subsequently influenced England's local instrument production.

Construction

Viols most commonly have six strings, although many 16th-century instruments had only four or five strings. Viols were (and are) strung with gut strings of lower tension than on the members of the violin family. Gut strings produce a sonority far different from steel, generally described as softer and sweeter. Around 1660, gut or silk core strings overspun with copper wire first became available; these were then used for the lowest-pitched bass strings on viols, and many other string instruments as well.

Viols are fretted like early guitars or lutes, using movable wrapped-around and tied-on gut frets. A low seventh string was supposedly added in France to the bass viol by Monsieur de Sainte-Colombe (c. 1640–1690), whose students included the French gamba virtuoso and composer Marin Marais. Also, the painting Saint Cecilia with an Angel (1618) by Domenichino (1581–1641) shows what may be a seven-string viol.

Unlike members of the violin family, which are tuned in fifths, viols are usually tuned in fourths with a major third in the middle, mirroring the tuning employed on the vihuela de mano and lute during the 16th century and similar to that of the modern six-string guitar.

Viols were first constructed much like the vihuela de mano, with all surfaces, top, back, and sides made from flat slabs or pieces of joined wood, bent or curved as required. However, some viols, both early and later, had carved tops, similar to those more commonly associated with instruments of the violin family. The ribs or sides of early viols were usually quite shallow, reflecting more the construction of their plucked vihuela counterparts. Rib depth increased during the 16th century, finally coming to resemble the greater depth of the classic 17th-century pattern.

The flat backs of most viols have a sharply angled break or canted bend in their surface close to where the neck meets the body. This serves to taper the back (and overall body depth) at its upper end to meet the back of the neck joint flush with its heel. Traditional construction uses animal glue, and internal joints are often reinforced with strips of either linen or vellum soaked in hot animal glue—a practice also employed in early plucked vihuela construction. The peg boxes of viols (which hold the tuning pegs) were typically decorated either with elaborately carved heads of animals or people or with the now-familiar spiral scroll finial.

The earliest vihuelas and viols, both plucked and bowed, all had sharp cuts to their waists, similar to the profile of a modern violin. This is a key and new feature—first appearing in the mid-15th century—and from then on, it was employed on many different types of string instruments. This feature is also key in seeing and understanding the connection between the plucked and bowed versions of early vihuelas. If one were to go searching for very early viols with smooth-curved figure-eight bodies, like those found on the only slightly later plucked vihuelas and the modern guitar, they would be out of luck. By the mid-16th century, however, "guitar-shaped" viols were fairly common, and a few of them survive.

The earliest viols had flat, glued-down bridges just like their plucked counterpart vihuelas. Soon after, however, viols adopted the wider and high-arched bridge that facilitated the bowing of single strings. The earliest of viols would also have had the ends of their fretboards flat on the deck, level with or resting upon the top or soundboard. Once the end of their fretboards was elevated above the top of the instrument's face, the entire top could vibrate freely. Early viols did not have sound posts, either (again reflecting their plucked vihuela siblings). This reduced damping again meant that their tops could vibrate more freely, contributing to the characteristic "humming" sound of viols; yet the absence of a sound post also resulted in a quieter and softer voice overall.

It is commonly believed that C-holes (a type and shape of pierced sound port visible on the top face or belly of string instruments) are a definitive feature of viols, a feature used to distinguish viols from instruments in the violin family, which typically had F-shaped holes. This generality, however, renders an incomplete picture. The earliest viols had either large, open, round, sound holes (or even round pierced rosettes like those found on lutes and vihuelas), or they had some kind of C-holes. Viols sometimes had as many as four small C-holes—one placed in each corner of the bouts—but more commonly, they had two. The two C-holes might be placed in the upper bouts, centrally, or in the lower bouts. In the formative years, C-holes were most often placed facing each other or turned inwards.

In addition to round or C-holes, however, and as early as the first quarter of the 16th century, some viols adopted S-shaped holes, again facing inward. By the mid-16th century, S-holes morphed into the classic F-shaped holes, which were then used by viols and members of the violin family alike. By the mid-to late 16th century, the viol's C-holes facing direction were reversed, becoming outward-facing. That configuration then became a standard feature of what we today call the “classic” 17th-century pattern. Yet another style of sound holes found on some viols was a pair of flame-shaped Arabesques placed left and right. The lute- and vihuela-like round or oval ports or rosettes became a standard feature of German and Austrian viols and were retained to the very end. That feature was unique to viols and reminded one always of the viol's more ancient plucked vihuela roots, the "cuteness" of viols.

Historians, makers, and players generally distinguish between renaissance and baroque viols. The latter are more heavily constructed and are fitted with a bass bar and sound post, like modern stringed instruments.

Viol bows
The bow is held underhand (palm up), similar to a German double bass bow grip, but away from the frog towards the balance point. The stick's curvature is generally convex as were violin bows of the period, rather than concave like a modern violin bow. The "frog" (which holds the bow hair and adjusts its tension) is also different from that of modern bows: whereas a violin bow frog has a "slide" (often made of mother of pearl), which pinches the hair and holds it flat and stationary across the frog, viol bows have an open frog that allows more movement of the hair. This facilitates a traditional playing technique where the performer uses one or two fingers of the bow hand to press the hair away from the bow stick. This dynamically increases bow hair tension to control articulation and inflection.

Different versions

Viols come in seven sizes: "pardessus de viole" (which is relatively rare, exclusively French and did not exist before the 18th century), treble (in French dessus), alto, tenor (in French taille), bass, and two sizes of contrabass (also known as a violone), the smaller one tuned an octave below the tenor (violone in G, sometimes called great bass or in French grande basse) and the larger one tuned an octave below the bass (violone in D, or the contrabass viol). This latter instrument is not to be confused with the double bass.

Their tuning (see next section) alternates G and D instruments: pardessus in G, treble in D, tenor in G, bass in D (the seven-string bass was a French invention, with an added low A), small violone in G, large violone in D. The alto (between the treble and the tenor) and the baritone (between the tenor and the bass) do not fit in this scheme. The treble has a size similar to a viola but with a deeper body; the typical bass is about the size of a cello. The pardessus and the treble were held vertically in the lap. The English made smaller basses known as division viols, and the still-smaller Lyra viol. The viola bastarda was a similar type of viol used in Italy for a virtuosic style of viol repertoire and performance. German consort basses were larger than the French instruments designed for continuo.

Those instruments were not all equally common. The typical Elizabethan consort of viols was composed of six instruments: two basses, two tenors and two trebles, or one bass, three tenors and two trebles (see Chest of viols). Thus the bass, tenor and treble were the central members of the family as far as music written specifically for viols is concerned. Besides consort playing the bass could also be used as a solo instrument (there were also smaller basses designed especially for a virtuosic solo role, see above division viol, lyra viol, viola bastarda). And the bass viol could also serve as a continuo bass. The pardessus was a French 18th-century instrument that was introduced to allow ladies to play mostly violin or flute music but eventually acquired its repertoire. The alto and the baritone were relatively rare smaller and larger versions of the tenor respectively. The violones were never part of the consort of viols but functioned as the contrabass of all kinds of instrumental combinations.

Tuning
The standard tuning of most viols is in fourths, with a major third in the middle (like the standard Renaissance lute tuning), or in fourths, with a major third in between the 2nd and 3rd strings. The following table shows the tunings that have been adopted at least somewhat widely during the 20th and 21st-century revival of the viols. (Lyra viol tunings are not included.)

Alternate tunings (called scordatura) were often employed, particularly in the solo lyra viol style of playing, which also made use of many techniques such as chords and pizzicato, not generally used in consort playing. An unusual style of pizzicato was known as a thump. Lyra viol music was also commonly written in tablature. There is a vast repertoire of this music, some by well-known composers and much by anonymous ones.

Much viol music predates the adoption of equal temperament tuning by musicians. The movable nature of the tied-on frets permits the viol player to make adjustments to the tempering of the instrument, and some players and consorts adopt meantone temperaments, which are more suited to Renaissance music. Several fretting schemes involve frets that are spaced unevenly to produce better-sounding chords in a limited number of "keys". In some of these schemes, the two strands of the gut that form the fret are separated so that the player can finger a slightly sharper or flatter version of a note (for example G versus A) to suit different circumstances.

Treatises

Descriptions and illustrations of viols are found in numerous early 16th-century musical treatises, including those authored by:

Sebastian Virdung: Musica getutsch, 1511
Hans Judenkunig: Ain schone kunstliche Vunderwaisung, 1523
Martin Agricola: Musica instrumentalis deutsch, 1528
Hans Gerle: Musica Teusch (or Teutsch), 1532

Both Agricola's and Gerle's works were published in various editions.

There were then several important treatises concerning or devoted to the viol. The first was by Silvestro Ganassi dal Fontego: Regola Rubertina & Lettione Seconda (1542/3). Diego Ortiz published Trattado de Glosas (Rome, 1553), an important book of music for the viol with both examples of ornamentation and pieces called Recercadas. In England, Christopher Simpson wrote the most important treatise, with the second edition being published in 1667 in parallel text (English and Latin). This has divisions at the back that are very worthwhile repertoire. A little later, in England, Thomas Mace wrote Musick's Monument, which deals more with the lute but has an important section on the viol. After this, the French treatises by Machy (1685), Rousseau (1687), Danoville (1687), and Etienne Loulie (1700) show further developments in playing technique.

Popularity

Viols were second in popularity only to the lute (although this is disputed), and like lutes, were very often played by amateurs. Affluent homes might have a so-called chest of viols, which would contain one or more instruments of each size. Gamba ensembles, called consorts, were common in the 16th and 17th centuries, when they performed vocal music (consort songs or verse anthems) as well as that written specifically for instruments. Only the treble, tenor, and bass sizes were regular members of the viol consort, which consisted of three, four, five, or six instruments. Music for consorts was very popular in England in Elizabethan times, with composers such as William Byrd and John Dowland, and, during the reign of King Charles I, John Jenkins, William Lawes and Tobias Hume. The last music for viol consorts before their modern revival was probably written in the early 1680s by Henry Purcell.

Perhaps even more common than the pure consort of viols was the mixed or broken consort (also called Morley consort). Broken consorts combined a mixture of different instruments—a small band, essentially—usually comprising a gathering of social amateurs and typically including such instruments as a bass viol, a lute or orpharion (a wire-strung lute, metal-fretted, flat-backed, and festoon-shaped), a cittern, a treble viol (or violin, as time progressed), sometimes an early keyboard instrument (virginal, spinet, or harpsichord), and whatever other instruments or players (or singers) might be available at the moment. The single most common and ubiquitous pairing of all was always and everywhere the lute and bass viol: for centuries, the inseparable duo.

The bass viola da gamba remained in use into the 18th century as a solo instrument (and to complement the harpsichord in basso continuo). It was a favorite instrument of Louis XIV and acquired associations of both courtliness and "Frenchness" (in contrast to the Italianate violin). Composers such as Marc-Antoine Charpentier, François Couperin, Marin Marais, Sainte Colombe, Johann Sebastian Bach, Johannes Schenck, DuBuisson, Antoine Forqueray, Charles Dollé and Carl Friedrich Abel wrote virtuoso music for it. Georg Philipp Telemann published his Twelve Fantasias for Viola da Gamba solo in 1735, when the instrument was already becoming out of fashion. However, viols fell out of use as concert halls grew larger and the louder and more penetrating tone of the violin family became more popular. In the 20th century, the viola da gamba and its repertoire were revived by early music enthusiasts, an early proponent being Arnold Dolmetsch.

The treble viol in d and the even smaller pardessus de viole in g (often with only five strings) were also popular instruments in the 18th century, especially in France. Composers like Jean-Baptiste Barrière, Georg Phillipp Telemann and Marin Marais wrote solo- and ensemble pieces for treble or pardessus. It was also common to play music for violins or flutes or unspecified top parts on small viols.

Historic viols survive in relatively great number, though very few remain in original condition. They can often be found in collections of historic musical instruments at museums and universities. Here are some of the extant historic viols at The Metropolitan Museum of Art:

 Division Viol by Barak Norman, London, 1692
 Bass Viol, labeled Richard Meares, London, ca. 1680
 Bass Viol by John Rose, ca. 1600, London
 English viol, unsigned, 17th century in spectacularly original condition
 Division Viol, School of Tielke, Hamburg, ca. 1720
 Bass Viol by Matthias Humel, 18th century, Nuremberg
 Bass Viol, Germany, 18th century
 Bass Viol by Nicolas Bertrand, Paris, 1720

Modern era
In the 20th and early 21st century, the viol is attracting ever more interest, particularly among amateur players and early music enthusiasts and societies, and in conservatories and music schools. This may be due to the increased availability of reasonably priced instruments from companies using more automated production techniques, coupled with the greater accessibility of early music editions and historic treatises. The viol is also regarded as a suitable instrument for adult learners; Percy Scholes wrote that the viol repertoire "belongs to an age that demanded musicianship more often than virtuosity." There are now many societies for people with an interest in the viol. The first was the Viola da Gamba Society (Great Britain), which was established in the United Kingdom in 1948 and has a worldwide membership. The Viola da Gamba Society of America followed in 1962, and with over 1000 members in North America and around the world remains the largest organization dedicated to the instrument. Since then, similar societies have been organized in several other nations. In the 1970s, the now-defunct Guitar and Lute Workshop in Honolulu, Hawaii generated resurgent interest in the viol and traditional luthierie methods within the western United States.

A notable youth viol group is the Gateshead Viol Ensemble. It consists of young players between the ages of 7 and 18 and is quite well known in the northeast of England. It gives young people the opportunity to learn the viol and gives concerts in the North East and abroad. Ensembles like these show that the viol is making a comeback. A living museum of historical musical instruments was created at the University of Vienna as a center for the revival of the instrument. More than 100 instruments, including approximately 50 historical viola da gambas in playable condition, are the property of this new concept of a museum: the Orpheon Foundation Museum of Historical Instruments. All the instruments of this museum are played by the Orpheon Baroque Orchestra, the Orpheon consort, or by musicians who receive an instrument for a permanent loan. The instruments can be seen during temporary exhibitions. They are studied and copied by violin makers, contributing to the extension of the general knowledge we have on the viola da gamba, its forms, and the different techniques used for its manufacture.

The 1991 feature film Tous les matins du monde (All the Mornings of the World) by Alain Corneau, based on the lives of Monsieur de Sainte-Colombe and Marin Marais, prominently featured these composers' music for the viola da gamba and brought viol music to new audiences. The film's bestselling soundtrack features performances by Jordi Savall, one of the best-known modern viola da gamba players. Among the foremost modern players of the viol are Alison Crum, Vittorio Ghielmi, Susanne Heinrich, Wieland Kuijken, Paolo Pandolfo, Andrea de Carlo, Hille Perl and Jonathan Dunford. Many fine modern viol consorts (ensembles) are also recording and performing, among them the groups Fretwork, the Rose Consort of Viols, Les Voix Humaines, and Phantasm. The Baltimore Consort specializes in Renaissance song (mostly English) with broken consort (including viols).

New compositions 
A number of contemporary composers have written for viol, and a number of soloists and ensembles have commissioned new music for viol. Fretwork has been most active in this regard, commissioning George Benjamin, Michael Nyman, Elvis Costello, Sir John Tavener, Orlando Gough, John Woolrich, Tan Dun, Alexander Goehr, Fabrice Fitch, Andrew Keeling, Thea Musgrave, Sally Beamish, Peter Sculthorpe, Gavin Bryars, Barrington Pheloung, Simon Bainbridge, Duncan Druce, Poul Ruders, Ivan Moody, and Barry Guy; many of these compositions may be heard on their 1997 CD Sit Fast. The Yukimi Kambe Viol Consort has commissioned and recorded many works by David Loeb, and the New York Consort of Viols has commissioned Bülent Arel, David Loeb, Daniel Pinkham, Tison Street, Frank Russo, Seymour Barab, William Presser, and Will Ayton, many of these compositions appearing on their 1993 CD Illicita Cosa.

The Viola da Gamba Society of America has also been a potent force fostering new compositions for the viol. Among the music publications of the Society is its New Music for Viols (NMV) a series devoted to newly written pieces. More critically, the Society sponsors the Leo M. Traynor Competition for new music for viols. The competition was first held in 1989 and has taken place every four to five years since. The competition is specifically for consort music for three to six viol that, like the repertoire of the Renaissance, is accessible to accomplished amateurs.

The Palazzo Strozzi in Florence commissioned composer Bruce Adolphe to create a work based on Bronzino poems, and the piece, "Of Art and Onions: Homage to Bronzino", features a prominent viola da gamba part. Jay Elfenbein has also written works for the Yukimi Kambe Viol Consort, Les Voix Humaines, and Elliot Z. Levine, among others. Other composers for viols include Moondog, Kevin Volans, Roy Whelden, Toyohiko Satoh, Roman Turovsky, Giorgio Pacchioni, Michael Starke, Emily Doolittle, and Jan Goorissen. Composer Henry Vega has written pieces for the Viol: "Ssolo," developed at the Institute for Sonology and performed by Karin Preslmayr, as well as for Netherlands-based ensemble The Roentgen Connection in 2011 with "Slow slower" for recorder, viola da gamba, harpsichord and computer.  The Aston Magna Music Festival has recently commissioned works including viol from composers Nico Muhly and Alex Burtzos. The Italian contemporary composer Carlotta Ferrari has written two pieces for viol: "Le ombre segrete" in 2015, and "Profondissimi affetti" in 2016, this latter being based on RPS modal harmony system.

Electric instruments
Since the early 1980s, numerous instrument makers, including Eric Jensen, Francois Danger, Jan Goorissen, and Jonathan Wilson, have experimented with the design and construction of electric viols. Like other acoustic instruments to which pickups or microphones have been added, electric viols are plugged into an instrument amplifier or a PA system, which makes them sound louder. As well, given that amplifiers and PA systems are electronic components, this gives the performer the ability to change the tone and sound of the instrument by adding effects units such as reverb or changing the tone with a graphic equalizer. An equalizer can be used to shape the sound of an electric viol to suit a performance space, or to create unusual new sounds. Electric viols range from Danger's minimally electrified acoustic/electric Altra line to Eric Jensen's solid-body brace-mounted design. They have met with varying degrees of ergonomic and musical success. In the early 21st century, the Ruby Gamba, a seven-string electric viola da gamba, was developed by Ruby Instruments of Arnhem, the Netherlands. It has 21 tied nylon (adjustable) frets in keeping with the adjustable (tied gut) frets on traditional viols and has an effective playing range of more than six octaves. Electric viols have been adopted by such contemporary gambists as Paolo Pandolfo, Tina Chancey, and Tony Overwater.

Similar names and common confusions
The viola da gamba is occasionally confused with the viola, the alto member of the modern violin family and a standard member of both the symphony orchestra and string quartet. In the 15th century, the Italian word "viola" was a generic term used to refer to any bowed instrument, or fiddle. It is important to note that the word "viola" existed in Italy before the vihuela, or first viol, was brought from Spain. In Italy, "viola" was first applied to a braccio precursor to the modern violin, as described by Tinctoris (De inventione et usu musice, c. 1481–3), and then was later used to describe the first Italian viols as well. Depending on the context, the unmodified viola da braccio most regularly denoted either an instrument from the violin family, or specifically the viola (whose specific name was "alto de viola da braccio"). When Monteverdi called simply for "viole da braccio" in "Orfeo", the composer was requesting violas as well as treble and bass instruments. The full name of the viola, namely "alto de viola da braccio", was finally shortened to "viola" in some languages (e.g. English, Italian, Spanish) once viols became less common, while other languages picked some other part of the phrase to designate the instrument, e.g. "alto" in French and "Bratsche" in German (the latter derived from the Italian "braccio").

Some other instruments have viola in their name, but are not a member of the viola da gamba family. These include the viola d'amore and the viola pomposa. Though the baryton does not have viola in its name, it is sometimes included in the viol family. Whether it is considered a member of this family is a matter of semantics. It is organologically closely related to the viola da gamba proper, but if we think of the family as the group of differently sized instruments that play together in consorts, the baryton would not be among this group.  The names viola (Italy) and vihuela (Spain) were essentially synonymous and interchangeable. According to viol historian Ian Woodfield, there is little evidence that the vihuela de arco was introduced to Italy before the 1490s. The term "viola" was never used exclusively for viols in the 15th or 16th centuries. In 16th century Italy, both "violas",—the early viols and violins—developed somewhat simultaneously. While violins, such as those of Amati, achieved their classic form before the first half of the century, the viol's form standardized later in the century at the hands of instrument makers in England.

Viola da gamba, viola cum arculo, and vihuela de arco are some (true) alternative names for viols. Both "vihuela" and "viola" were originally used in a fairly generic way, having included even early violins (viola da braccio) under their umbrella. It is common enough (and justifiable) today for modern players of the viola da gamba to call their instruments violas and likewise to call themselves violists. That the "alto violin" eventually became known simply as the "viola" is not without historical context, yet the ambiguity of the name tends to cause some confusion. The violin, or violino, was originally the soprano viola da braccio, or violino da braccio. Due to the popularity of the soprano violin, the entire consort eventually took on the name "violin family". Some other names for viols include viole or violle (French). In Elizabethan English, the word "gambo" (for gamba) appears in many permutations; e.g., "viola de gambo", "gambo violl", "viol de gambo", or "viole de gambo", used by such notables as Tobias Hume, John Dowland, and William Shakespeare in Twelfth Night. Viol da Gamba and Gamba also appear as string family stops on the pipe organ. These stops are sounds created by organ pipes made to imitate the sound of the viol da gamba.

See also

 Arpeggione
 Cello da spalla
 GuitarViol
 Lyra viol
 :Category:Viol players

Notes

References

Sources
 Pio, Stefano (2012). "Viol and Lute Makers of Venice 1490 -1630" Ed. Venice research, Venice Italy, . www.veniceresearch.com
 Otterstedt, Annette. The Viol: History of an Instrument. Kassel: Barenreiter;-Verlag Karl Votterle GmbH & Co; 2002. .
 Woodfield, Ian(1984). Brown, Howard Mayer; le Huray, Peter; Stevens, John; eds. The Early History of the Viol. Cambridge, UK: Cambridge University Press. .

Further reading
 Bryan, John (2005). "In Search of the Earliest Viols: Interpreting the Evidence from a Painting by Lorenzo Costa". The Viola da Gamba Society of Great Britain, Newsletter, no. 131.
 Crum, Alison, with Sonia Jackson (1992). Play the Viol: The Complete Guide to Playing the Treble, Tenor and Bass Viol. Oxford University Press. .
 Hoffmann, Bettina (2018). The Viola da Gamba. London and New York: Routledge . Reprinted 2019 .
 O'Loghlin, Michael. Frederick the Great and his Musicians: the Viola da Gamba Music of the Berlin School (Routledge, 2017); the famous Prussian king (1712–1786) was a musician and patron of music.
 Woodfield, Ian; Robinson, Lucy. Viol [viola da gamba, gamba]. In: Sadie, Stanley, ed. The New Grove Dictionary of Music and Musicians.Vol. 19. London, UK: Macmillan Publishers Ltd; 1980;791–808.

External links

Viola da Gamba Society of America site
Viola da Gamba Society of Great Britain site
Transcriptions and facsimiles of viol treatises 
Viola da gamba collection of the Orpheon Foundation
the English division viol
The site on Joachim Tielke, the great Hamburg viol maker
Many viol pictures; fingering patterns; argues for relationship to modern guitar
 

 
Renaissance instruments
Basso continuo instruments